Soldier's heart may refer to:

Media
"Soldier's Heart" (song), a 2003 song by R. Kelly
Soldier's Heart (novel), a 1998 historical novella by Gary Paulsen
Soldier's Heart (play), a Canadian play by David French
Soldier's Heart (Ames novel), a 1996 novel by John Edward Ames
Soldier's Heart: The Campaign to Understand My WWII Veteran Father: A Daughter's Memoir, a 2015 graphic novel by Carol Tyler
"Soldier's Heart", an episode of the New Amsterdam TV series

Health

Da Costa's syndrome, several distinct disorders that were historically known collectively as soldier's heart
Postural orthostatic tachycardia syndrome (POTS) and other related forms of dysautonomia; still in use in some areas
Posttraumatic stress disorder, historically known as soldier's heart in veterans of the American Civil War